The Bishop's Emeralds is a lost 1919 silent film drama directed by John B. O'Brien and featuring Virginia Pearson and her real life spouse Sheldon Lewis. It was produced by Louis B. Mayer and released through Pathé Exchange.

Cast
Virginia Pearson – Hester, Lady Cardew
Sheldon Lewis
Robert Broderick – Lord John Cardew, Bishop of Ripley
Frank Kingsley – Jack Cardew, his son
Lucy Fox – Mabel Bannister
Marcia Harris – Caroline Cardew
Walter Newman – Voss, Bannister's valet
Sheldon Lewis – Richard Bannister

References

External links
 The Bishop's Emeralds at IMDb.com

1919 films
American silent feature films
Lost American films
Films based on British novels
American black-and-white films
Films set in England
1919 drama films
Silent American drama films
Pathé Exchange films
1919 lost films
Lost drama films
Films directed by John B. O'Brien
1910s American films